J. Nicole Shelton is an American psychologist and Stuart Professor of Psychology at Princeton University. Her research focuses on racial prejudice and interactions between whites and ethnic minorities.

Early life and education
Shelton grew up in Virginia and received a Bachelor of Arts degree in psychology from the College of William & Mary in 1993. She received a Master of Arts in 1996 and a Ph.D. in psychology in 1998, both from the University of Virginia.

Career 
Shelton joined the Department of Psychology at Princeton University in 2000 and is currently a Stuart Professor of Psychology. She leads the Stigma and Social Perception Lab there with professor Stacey Sinclair.

From 2012 to 2020, Shelton also served as the head of Butler College and serves as an Athletics Fellow to the Princeton women's basketball team.

Selected articles
Shelton, J.N. (2000). A reconceptualization of how we study issues of racial prejudice. Personality and Social Psychology Review, 4, 374–390.
Shelton, J.N. (2003). Interpersonal concerns in social encounters between majority and minority group members. Group Processes and Intergroup Relations, 6, 171–186.
Richeson, J.A. & Shelton, J. N. (2003). When prejudice does not pay: Effects of interracial contact on executive function. Psychological Science, 14, 287–290.
Sellers, R.M. & Shelton, J.N. (2003). The role of racial identity in perceived racial discrimination. Journal of Personality and Social Psychology, 84, 1079–1092.
 Shelton, J. N. (2003). Interpersonal concerns in social encounters between majority and minority group members. Group Processes & Intergroup Relations, 6(2), 171–185.
 "Richeson, J. A., & Shelton, J. N. (2003). When prejudice does not pay: Effects of interracial contact on executive function. Psychological Science, 14(3), 287–290.
Sellers, R. M., & Shelton, J. N. (2003). The role of racial identity in perceived racial discrimination. Journal of personality and social psychology, 84(5), 1079..

External links
 Nicole Shelton Faculty Profile, Princeton University

References

Living people
Year of birth missing (living people)
African-American psychologists
College of William & Mary alumni
Princeton University faculty
Social psychologists
University of Virginia alumni
American women psychologists
21st-century American psychologists